Plagiosaurus is an extinct genus of temnospondyl amphibian - Arthur Smith Woodward regarded it as a synonym of Plagiosternum. They were paedomorphic, retaining the larval gills on adulthood. They had weak simplified vertebrae, consisting of large intercentra and neural arches, the stereospondyl condition.

References 

Triassic temnospondyls of Europe
Plagiosauridae